Kaz Air Trans is a charter airline founded in 2008 and based in Almaty, Kazakhstan.

Fleet
The Kaz Air Trans fleet consists of the following aircraft :

2018 accident

On Jul 20, 2018 a Kaz Air Trans Antonov AN-26, registration UP-AN611 performing flight KUY-9554 from Kiev (Ukraine) to El-Alamein (Egypt) with 6 crew, was nearing El-Alamein when the aircraft disappeared from radar screens prompting El-Alamein tower to notify Egypt's Search and Rescue centre. A search located the aircraft about 48nm from the aerodrome.

The aircraft had been in perfect technical condition prior to the 6 hours flight. The crew was forced to make an emergency landing 48km from El-Alamein after they ran out of fuel - the incident was ruled an accident. Egypt's Ministry of Transport reported all 6 members of the crew were rescued uninjured.

References

2012 establishments in Kazakhstan
Airlines established in 2012
Airlines of Kazakhstan
Airlines formerly banned in the European Union